The 2012–13 Baylor Lady Bears basketball team represented Baylor University in the 2012–13 NCAA Division I women's basketball season. The Lady Bears were led by 13th season head coach Hall of Famer Kim Mulkey, with the team playing its home games at the Ferrell Center in Waco, Texas as members of the Big 12 Conference.

The Lady Bears began the season as the preseason #1 team in both the Associated Press and the Coaches' Poll after they finished the 2011-2012 through the season undefeated, winning the Big 12 regular season, Big 12 Tournament and the National Championship with a 40–0 record.  Baylor returned all five starters and welcomed a freshman class of four players.

Roster

Schedule

|-
! colspan=9 style="background:#FECB00; color:#003015;"|Exhibition

|-
!colspan=9 style="background:#003015; color:#FECB00;"| Regular Season

|-
! colspan=9 style="background:#FECB00; color:#003015;"|2013 Big 12 women's basketball tournament

|-
! colspan=9 style="background:#FECB00; color:#003015;"|2013 NCAA tournament

Source

See also
 2012–13 Baylor Bears basketball team

References

Baylor Bears women's basketball seasons
Baylor
Baylor
Baylor Lady Bears